"The Barber" is the 72nd episode of the NBC sitcom Seinfeld. It is the eighth episode of the fifth season, and first aired on November 11, 1993. The episode deals with Jerry's struggle to get a good haircut without offending his usual barber, who is bad at cutting hair. Meanwhile, George begins showing up to work at a company which he is not sure has actually hired him.

Plot
At a job interview, George's interviewer, Mr. Tuttle, is cut off mid-sentence by a telephone call, and sends George away without saying whether he has been hired. Tuttle told George that one of the things that make George such an attractive hire is that he can "understand everything immediately," so George is afraid to call and ask for clarification. He decides to just show up, assuming that he has been hired, while Tuttle is out of town. This way, even if he was not hired, he will be ensconced in the company by the time Tuttle returns.

Elaine asks Jerry to get a haircut in order to look nice for an upcoming bachelor auction. Jerry's regular barber, Enzo, is bad at cutting hair and Jerry only continues to use him out of loyalty. Kramer recommends that Jerry see Enzo's nephew Gino on Enzo's day off. Enzo shows up in the shop and, delighted to see Jerry, insists on giving him a haircut even though it is his day off. Enzo tries something new, which turns out to be worse than his usual cut. Kramer arranges a clandestine haircut in Gino's apartment to fix the problem. Enzo turns up unexpectedly, forcing Jerry to hide in the closet after Gino has made only a single snip. Enzo finds Jerry's hair on the floor. He bribes Newman to get a sample of Jerry's hair to compare with. The hairs match. Enzo swears revenge, and confronts Gino and Jerry in Jerry's apartment. However, they catch Edward Scissorhands on the television and stop to watch it. Jerry realizes that the hair sample Enzo used must have been obtained by Newman during his suspicious visit to the apartment.

George, who has no idea what his duties are at his new place of work, is handed the "Pensky file" to work on. George loafs at work for a week. When Mr. Pensky comes to inquire about the progress of his file, he tells George he would like him to work at his company, but is interrupted mid-sentence, leaving George to once again draw his own conclusions. Tuttle returns from vacation. He confirms that George was indeed hired, but is incensed when he learns he has made no progress on the Pensky file. George quits, thinking Pensky has a space for him. However, Pensky explains that he was in the middle of saying that the entire board of the company has been indicted and the company cannot hire anyone.

Because Jerry is self-conscious about his awful haircut, Kramer is sent to the bachelor auction in his place. Unconvinced of Kramer's sex appeal, Elaine starts the bidding for him at $5. Jerry finds Newman in the barber shop, menacingly approaching him with an electric razor. Later in a telephone exchange with Kramer, it is revealed that Newman has been shaved bald.

Music
Throughout this episode, the familiar Seinfeld slap-bass incidental music is replaced with selections from the overture of Gioachino Rossini's The Barber of Seville.

References

External links 
 

Seinfeld (season 5) episodes
1993 American television episodes